Winifred Evans (born 4 July 1890, London) was a British actress. In 1921 she appeared as a Germany spy in the controversial film How Kitchener Was Betrayed which was ultimately banned.

Selected filmography
 The Happy Warrior (1917)
 The Splendid Coward (1918)
 The Lady Clare (1919)
 How Kitchener Was Betrayed (1921)
 Greatheart (1921)
 Cupid in Clover (1929)
 Three Men in a Boat (1933)

References

Bibliography
 Robertson, James Crighton. The hidden cinema: British film censorship in action, 1913-1975. Routledge, 1993.

External links
 

1890 births
English stage actresses
English film actresses
English silent film actresses
20th-century English actresses
Actresses from London
Year of death missing